John Charles Lugg (3 December 1919 – 8 February 1994) was an Australian rules footballer who played with South Melbourne in the Victorian Football League (VFL).

Notes

External links 

1919 births
1994 deaths
Australian rules footballers from Victoria (Australia)
Sydney Swans players